Alain Djene Djento (1963 – 14 December 2022) was a Cameroonian singer-songwriter.

Biography
Djento was born in the Ngodi neighborhood of Douala in 1963. He began his career in 1970 with the group Les Johnco alongside  and Manulo Nguime. At the start of the 1980s, he formed the group N’Kumbe alongside Nguime, Ngoloko Zachée, and Patrick Djerky. He released his first album in 1983, titled Débroussailler.

Djene Djento died in Dschang on 14 December 2022.

Discography
Débroussailler (1983)
Ndjangui Moni (1985)
Ndola Bwanga (1987)
Ma Thérèse (1989)
Pompé (1990)
8e Commandement (1998)
Mota Sawa (2008)
Vivre ensemble (2018)

References

External Links
 

1963 births
2022 deaths
20th-century Cameroonian male singers
21st-century Cameroonian male singers
People from Douala